VAHS may refer to:

Schools 
 Vail Academy and High School, Tucson, Arizona, United States
 Verona Area High School, Verona, Wisconsin, United States
 Vicenza American High School, a United States Department of Defense Dependent School in Vicenza, Italy

Other uses
  Victorian Aboriginal Health Service, Melbourne, Australia, co-founded by Alma Thorpe
 Voice for Animals Humane Society, a Canadian non-profit organisation
 Voluntary Action History Society, a British learned society